Hoseynabad-e Kordha may refer to:
 Hoseynabad-e Kordha, North Khorasan
 Hoseynabad-e Kordha, Semnan